Norihito is a common Japanese given name for males, including:

Prince Norihito, later the Prince Takamado of Japan, grandson of Emperor Taishō
Prince Norihito (憲仁親王 Norihito Shinnō), seventh son of Emperor Go-Shirakawa (後白河天皇 Go-Shirakawa Tennō), later Emperor Takakura (高倉天皇 Takakura Tennō), emperor of Japan
, Japanese Nordic combined skier

Japanese masculine given names